Thomas Hasilden (died c. 1404), of Guilden Morden, Cambridgeshire, was an English politician.

He was a Member (MP) of the Parliament of England for Cambridgeshire in 1395, January 1397, September 1397 and 1401.

References

People from South Cambridgeshire District
14th-century births
1404 deaths
English MPs 1395
English MPs January 1397
English MPs September 1397
English MPs 1401